King of Ruthenia, King of Rus', King of Galicia and Lodomeria, Land of Ruthenia Lord and Heir (Ukrainian: Король Русі, король Галичини і Володимирії, князь і володар Всієї Землі Руської; Latin: Rex Rusiae, Rex Galiciae et Lodomeriae, Terrae Russiae Dominus et Heres) was a title of princes of Galicia and Volhynia, granted by the Pope.

The title was initially issued to the ruling Izyaslavichi branch of Rurik dynasty of Volhynia. By the 15th century the title was used as a claim by other royal houses.

List of kings of Ruthenia

Kings of Kyivan Rus 

 Iziaslav I of Kyiv (as König der Russen)
 Yaropolk Izyaslavich

Kings of Ruthenia (Kingdom of Ruthenia)

 Danylo I of Halych, king of Rus' (1253–1264).
 Lev I of Halych, king of Rus' (1293–1301), moved the capital from Kholm to Lviv in 1272.
 Yuri I of Halych, prince of Halych-Volhynia (1301–1308)
 Andrew I of Halych (Volhynia) and Lev II of Halych (Galicia), the last Ruthenian kings
 Yuri II Boleslav, married Maria co-ruler of Galicia (1325–1340) Maria was Andrew's and Leo's sister
 Dmytro Dedko, Lord of Rus', Prince of Galicia (1340-1349)
 Liubartas, married Euphemia (Hanna-Buch), co-ruler of Volhynia (1323–1366), prince of eastern Volhynia (1366–1384) Euphemia was Andrew's and Leo's sister
 Casimir III the Great, King of Poland (1333–1370), Lord of Rus' (1349-1370)

After the death of Boleslav-Yuri II of Halych, Galicia–Volhynia Wars ensued which resulted in Galicia gradually being annexed by the Kingdom of Poland, between 1349 and 1366, during the reign of Casimir III of Poland.

At the death of Casimir III the Great all of titulage was passed over to Louis I of Hungary

Kings of Galicia–Volhynia (Kingdom of Hungary)
 Andrew II of Hungary, the son of Béla III of Hungary, the first nominal king of Galicia who, as a Hungarian prince, reigned from 1188 to 1190.
 Coloman of Galicia-Lodomeria (Kálmán), the first king of Galicia and Lodomeria, lat. Rex Galiciae et Lodomeriae (1215–1219) and his wife Salomea of Poland, Reges Galiciae et Lodomeriae
 Andrew (András), the younger brother of Coloman, Hungarian prince, king of Galicia and Lodomeria (1219–1221)
 Louis I of Hungary, King of Hungary (1342–1382), King of Poland (1370–1382), incorporated Halych–Volhynia to Hungary
 Władysław II Opolczyk, Silesian prince, Hungarian count palatine, Lord of Rus’/Ruthenia (1372–1378)

After 1378 
In the subsequent years, all Kings of Poland styled themselves Lord of Rus’ (or Ruthenia). Simultaneously, the tsars of Russia adopted from 1547 onwards the title Tsar of All-Rus’ . The Hungarian kings continued to claim the title of King in Halych and Volhynia, later taken over together with the Hungarian Crown by the Holy Roman emperors.

After Partitions of Poland 
After the Partitions of Poland, the tsars of Russia styled themselves Emperor of all the Russias, while the Holy Roman Emperors (later emperors of Austria and of Austria-Hungary) used the title of King of Galicia and Lodomeria drawn from the historical claims of Hungarian Kings to Halych–Volhynia to justify the annexations of territories belonging to Polish-Lithuanian Commonwealth, in spite of the fact that the newly established rump puppet Kingdom of Galicia and Lodomeria was included in the Austrian instead of Hungarian part of the empire, the true historical claimant of the region. Part of Galicia was included in the puppet Kingdom of Poland (1916-1918) re-established by the Central Powers and ruled by the Regency Council. All these monarchies were abolished upon the end of World War I. However, the Kingdom of Hungary was formally re-established in 1920 along with its royal titles and styles, and its territory even included at a time the Carpathian Ruthenia, following the breakup of the Second Czechoslovak Republic. Nevertheless, its throne remained vacant until the ultimate abolition of Hungarian monarchy in 1946.

Notes 

History of Ukraine
Ruthenian nobility